A mudflow, also known as mudslide or mud flow, is a form of mass wasting involving fast-moving flow of debris and dirt that has become liquified by the addition of water. Such flows can move at speeds ranging from 3 meters/minute to 5 meters/second. Mudflows contain a significant proportion of clay, which makes them more fluid than debris flows, allowing them to travel farther and across lower slope angles. Both types of flow are generally mixtures of particles with a wide range of sizes, which typically become sorted by size upon deposition.

Mudflows are often called mudslips, a term applied indiscriminately by the mass media to a variety of mass wasting events. Mudflows often start as slides, becoming flows as water is entrained along the flow path; such events are often called mud failures.

Other types of mudflows include lahars (involving fine-grained pyroclastic deposits on the flanks of volcanoes) and jökulhlaups (outbursts from under glaciers or icecaps).

A statutory definition of "flood-related mudslide" appears in the United States' National Flood Insurance Act of 1968, as amended, codified at 42 USC Sections 4001 and following.

Triggering of mudflows 
 Heavy rainfall, snowmelt, or high levels of groundwater flowing through cracked bedrock may trigger a movement of soil or sediments in landslides that continue as mudflows. Floods and debris flows may also occur when strong rains on hill or mountain slopes cause extensive erosion and/or mobilize loose sediment that is located in steep mountain channels. The 2006 Sidoarjo mud flow may have been caused by rogue drilling.

The point where a muddy material begins to flow depends on its grain size, the water content, and the slope of the topography. Fine grained material like mud or sand can be mobilized by shallower flows than a coarse sediment or a debris flow.  Higher water content (higher precipitation/overland flow) also increases the potential to initiate a mudflow.

After a mudflow forms, coarser sediment may be picked up by the flow.   Coarser sediment picked up by the flow often forms the front of a mudflow surge and is pushed by finer sediment and water that pools up behind the coarse-grained moving mudflow-front. Mudflows may contain multiple surges of material as the flow scours channels and destabilizes adjacent hillslopes (potentially nucleating new mudflows). Mudflows have mobilized boulders 1–10 m across in mountain settings.

Some broad mudflows are rather viscous and therefore slow; others begin very quickly and continue like an avalanche. They are composed of at least 50% silt and clay-sized materials and up to 30% water. Because mudflows mobilize a significant amount of sediment, mudflows have higher flow heights than a clear water flood for the same water discharge.  Also, sediment within the mudflow increases granular friction within the flow structure of the flow relative to clear water floods, which raises the flow depth for the same water discharge. Difficulty predicting the amount and type of sediment that will be included in a mudflow makes it much more challenging to forecast and engineer structures to protect against mudflow hazards compared to clear water flood hazards.

Mudflows are common even in the hills around Los Angeles, California, where they have destroyed many homes built on hillsides without sufficient support after fires destroy vegetation holding the land.

On 14 December 1999 in Vargas, Venezuela, a mudflow known as The Vargas tragedy significantly altered more than 60 kilometers (37 mi) of the coastline. It was triggered by heavy rainfall and caused estimated damages of US$1.79 to US$3.5 billion, killed between 10,000 and 30,000 people, forced 85,000 people to evacuate, and led to the complete collapse of the state's infrastructure.

Mudflows and landslides 

Landslide is a more general term than mudflow. It refers to the gravity-driven failure and subsequent movement downslope of any types of surface movement of soil, rock, or other debris. The term incorporates earth slides, rock falls, flows, and mudslides, amongst other categories of hillslope mass movements. They do not have to be as fluid as a mudflow.

Mudflows can be caused by unusually heavy rains or a sudden thaw. They consist mainly of mud and water plus fragments of rock and other debris, so they often behave like floods. They can move houses off their foundations or bury a place within minutes because of incredibly strong currents.

Mudflow geography 

When a mudflow occurs it is given four named areas, the 'main scarp', in bigger mudflows the 'upper and lower shelves' and the 'toe'. The main scarp will be the original area of incidence, the toe is the last affected area(s). The upper and lower shelves are located wherever there is a large dip (due to mountain or natural drop) in the mudflow's path. A mudflow can have many shelves.

Largest recorded mudflow

Directly in the path of the huge mudflow was Spirit Lake. Normally a chilly , the lahar instantly raised the temperature to near .

The largest known of all prehistoric landslides was an enormous submarine landslide that disintegrated 60,000 years ago and produced the longest flow of sand and mud yet documented on Earth. The massive submarine flow travelled  – the distance from London to Rome.

By volume, the largest submarine landslide (the Agulhas slide off South Africa) occurred approximately 2.6 million years ago.

Areas at risk

The area most generally recognized as being at risk of a dangerous mudflow are:
 Areas where wildfires or human modification of the land have destroyed vegetation
 Areas where landslides have occurred before
 Steep slopes and areas at the bottom of slopes or canyons
 Slopes that have been altered for construction of buildings and roads
 Channels along streams and rivers
 Areas where surface runoff is directed

See also
 Quick clay, also known as Leda clay
 Osceola Mudflow, occurred on Mt. Rainier's White River drainage.

Citations

References
 
 
 . On-line publication 30 November 2013.
 .

Further reading
 .

External links 
 United States Department of Homeland Security: Facts about Mudflows/Landslides.

Weather hazards
Geology articles needing expert attention
Landslide types
Natural disasters